Acco fasciata is a moth of the family Erebidae. It was described by Rob de Vos and Henricus Jacobus Gerardus van Mastrigt in 2007. It is found in Western New Guinea, Indonesia.

References

Moths described in 2007
Erebid moths of Asia
Moths of Indonesia
Nudariina